Bonsecours is a municipality in Le Val-Saint-François Regional County Municipality in the Estrie region of Quebec, Canada.

Demographics

Population

Language
Mother tongue (2011)

See also
List of municipalities in Quebec

References

External links

Municipalities in Quebec
Incorporated places in Estrie